Claire Anderson may refer to:

 Claire Anderson (actress) (1891–1964), American actress
 Claire Anderson (bowls) (born 1992), Scottish lawn bowler
 Claire Anderson (DJ), English radio DJ, television presenter and voice-over artist
 Claire Anderson (scientist), British pharmacist